The robust dwarf gecko (Lygodactylus pictus) is a species of gecko endemic to southern Madagascar.

References

Lygodactylus
Endemic fauna of Madagascar
Reptiles of Madagascar
Reptiles described in 1883
Taxa named by Wilhelm Peters